The statue of a Czech poet and publicist Jan Neruda is an outdoor 1970 sculpture by Jan Simota and Karel Lapka, installed at Petřín, Malá Strana in Prague, Czech Republic.

References

External links

 

1970 sculptures
Malá Strana
Monuments and memorials in Prague
Outdoor sculptures in Prague
Sculptures of men in Prague
Statues in Prague
Petřín